André Vlayen (17 March 1931 – 20 February 2017) was a Belgian racing cyclist. He won the Belgian national road race title in 1956 and 1957.

References

External links
 

1931 births
2017 deaths
Belgian male cyclists
Cyclists from Antwerp Province
People from Herselt